"Omen" is a song by English electronic music duo Disclosure. It features the vocals from English singer Sam Smith. It was released as a digital download on 27 July 2015, by Island Records. It is the second single from Disclosure's second studio album, Caracal (2015), following "Holding On". It was written by Guy Lawrence, Howard Lawrence and Smith and co-written by Jimmy Napes. It is the second collaboration between Smith and Disclosure, following "Latch" in 2012. The song charted in multiple countries and is featured on the soundtrack for the video game, FIFA 16.

Music video
A music video of the track was released on 27 July 2015. It was the second part of a three-part series, preceded by "Holding On" and followed by "Jaded". The video was filmed at the Teatro Fru Fru in Mexico City.

Track listing
Digital download
"Omen" (featuring Sam Smith) – 3:50

Digital download – The Remixes
"Omen" (Claptone remix) – 6:10
"Omen" (Jonas Rathsman remix) – 8:32
"Omen" (Claude VonStroke remix) – 7:03
"Omen" (Motez remix) – 4:43
"Omen" (Klyne remix) – 3:25

12" remix EP
"Omen" (album version) – 3:50
"Omen" (Claude VonStroke remix) – 7:03
"Omen" (Jonas Rathsman remix) – 8:32
"Omen" (Motez remix) – 4:43

Charts

Weekly charts

Year-end charts

Certifications

Release history

See also
 List of number-one dance singles of 2015 (U.S.)

References

2015 singles
2015 songs
Disclosure (band) songs
Sam Smith (singer) songs
UK garage songs
Songs written by Sam Smith (singer)
Songs written by Jimmy Napes
Songs written by Guy Lawrence
Songs written by Howard Lawrence